Hugh Montieth (11 May 1883 – 10 October 1963) was a Scotland international rugby union player.

Rugby Union career

Amateur career

He went to Fettes College and played rugby union for the school side.

He played for Cambridge University.

He then played for London Scottish.

He played for the Army Rugby Union.

He also played for the Royal London Hospital rugby union club.

Provincial career

He played for the Anglo-Scots against South of Scotland District on 26 December 1903.

He represented Provinces District in 1906 and 1907.

International career

He played 8 times for Scotland, scoring 1 try.

Military career

He joined the RAMC and became a captain. He was attached to the 2nd battalion of the Duke of Cornwall's Light Infantry.

He was awarded the D.S.O in 1915:
For conspicuous gallantry and devotion to duty in picking up and attending to the wounded updet heavy fire in the actions near St. Jean and Wieltje, east of Ypres, between 23rd and 27th April. when the casualties in the battalion to which he was attached were very heavy.

He then was in the Indian Army later in the First World War.

Family

His parents were Rev. John Monteith and Ellen Maria Neve (1845-1912). They had 3 sons including Hugh.

Hugh married Dorothy Huntly Dunell in October 1915 in Garboldisham, near Thetford in Norfolk, England. Dorothy was the eldest daughter of Owen Robert Dunell (1856-1929) and Marion Isabel Huntly (1864-1937) of Garboldisham Manor.

They had 2 children Cynthia Monteith (1916-1989) and Ronald Hugh Monteith (1918-1945).

References

1883 births
1963 deaths
Scottish rugby union players
Rugby union forwards
Scotland international rugby union players
Provinces District (rugby union) players
Cambridge University R.U.F.C. players
London Scottish F.C. players
Scottish Exiles (rugby union) players
Army rugby union players
Rugby union players from Dumfries and Galloway